Rev. Shubael Dummer (16 February 1636 – 25 January 1692) was an American Congregational church minister who was killed in the Candlemas Massacre in York, Maine. Described as a man of "beautiful Christian character", Dummer founded the First Parish Congregational Church of York, the oldest church congregation in the U.S. state of Maine.

Family and education
Dummer was born at Roxbury on 16 February 1636, the son of Richard Dummer (1589–1679) and his first wife Mary Jane Mason. Richard was a settler, who had arrived at Boston from England in May 1632 with Mary, and was an associate of the radical Puritan malcontent Stephen Bachiler. Mary was a follower of Roger Williams and Anne Hutchinson, leading to her and Richard becoming banished to Boston. Soon after the birth of Shubael, Mary became ill and died in February 1636.

Following the death of his wife, Richard returned to England. It is not known whether or not he was accompanied by his infant son; Richard returned to New England in May 1638 on board the Bevis and Shubael is not listed as one of the passengers.

Shubael was brought up under the ministry of Rev. Thomas Parker, one of the most eminent scholars and Christians among the founders of New England, who educated him and prepared him for admission to college. He went up to Harvard, from where he graduated in 1656 at the age of twenty.

Shortly afterwards at Salisbury, he married Lydia Alcock, daughter of John and Elizabeth Alcock.

Richard remarried (to Frances Burr) in 1643 and their first son, Jeremiah, was born on 14 September. He was to become the first American-born silversmith. Jeremiah's sons included William, who became Governor of the Province of Massachusetts Bay, and Jeremiah, who was involved in the foundation of Yale University.

Ministry

At the age of 24, he became a preacher in Salisbury, where he remained for two years, before settling in York in 1662. In 1660, the town of Salisbury tried unsuccessfully to obtain his services as minister.

Dummer was made a Freeman of Massachusetts Colony on 3 May 1665.

The meeting house at York was built in 1667 on "land given to the use of the ministry", part of it a glebe granted by Governor Edward Godfrey for the maintenance of a "house for the worship of God and endowment of minister." It was situated at what is now Lindsay Road close to Barrells Millpond.

On 3 December 1672, he was ordained to the Ministry and settled over the church at York, on the recommendation of Richard Banks, his brother-in-law, and Edward Rishworth. At his ordination, he preached a sermon from Psalm  based on the lines: "Return, O Lord, and visit this vine".

On 7 July 1674, his father made over to him lands at Byfield. The following year, he was listed as administrator of the estate of his father-in-law, John Alcock, together with his brothers-in-law, Joseph Alcock and Richard Banks.

At this time, the people of the church were poor with the early settlers in the town being adventurers; the town had had no one preacher for any length of time and was seen as "an asylum for excommunicated and itinerant ministers". According to the writer Cotton Mather, Dummer "spent very much of his own patrimony to subsist among the people". In 1690, he went to Boston to secure help, for at that time things were hard-going for the people of Maine and southern New Hampshire.

The parish records were lost when the church was destroyed by fire, and consequently there is little detailed information about Dummer's thirty years at York. Dummer is known, however, to have officiated at the wedding of James Smith of Berwick and Martha Mills at Wells in June 1677.

Despite his family advising him to find a safer ministry, Dummer continued to support the people of the town through their various trials and sufferings on account of the Indian wars and urged the townspeople to maintain their ground, and not allow their homes and farms to be destroyed by the enemy, as had some of the surrounding settlements. According to Cotton Mather:

Though solicited with many temptations to leave his place, when the clouds grew thick and dark in the Indian hostilities, and was like to break upon it, he chose, rather, with a paternal affection to stay amongst those who had been so many of them converted and edified by his ministry.

After Dummer's death, Mather gave this eulogy:

Our Dummer, the minister of York, was one of whom, for his exemplary holiness, humbleness, modesty, industry and fidelity, the world was not worthy. He was a gentleman well descended, well tempered, and well educated . . . He might have taken for the coat of arms, the same that the holy martyr Hooper did prophetically, - a lamb in a flaming bush, with rays from heaven shining of it.

Death

On 25 January 1692, a band of Abenaki, together with several French Canadians, came down from the North, making their way on snow shoes over the deep snow. The attackers waited until daybreak when they posted themselves at the door of each dwelling.

Dummer was one of the first to be killed as he was about to mount his horse to visit a sick parishioner. The invaders stripped and mutilated his corpse; his friends, who escaped by being in the garrisoned houses, or on the west side of the river, later found his body near his own door, "naked and in his blood, with his face to the ground". Capt. John Flood, who had come with the militia from Portsmouth,  found on his arrival that "the greatest part of the whole town was burned and robbed," with nearly 50 killed and another 100 captured. He reported that Rev. Dummer was "barbarously murthered, stript naked, cut and mangled by these sons of Beliall."

Before the invaders marched off their hostages, they sent back the youngest children and the oldest women. Dummer's widow, Lydia, was among those freed, but she shuttled back and forth to the raiders' camp so often, begging for the release of her infant son, that she was taken with the rest of the hostages. The captives were marched off "through snows and hardships among those dragons of the desert" where Lydia also died. On the first Sabbath after they started on their journey, an Abenaki, dressed in the clothes stripped from Dummer's dead body, "paraded himself before them with mock dignity, and in derision of a Puritan minister – a devil as an angel of light".

It is not known what became of the boy.

Obituary

Notes
A. Some sources give her name as "Alcott", although this is believed to be a simple discrepancy in spelling. Several, older, sources claim that his wife was Mary, the daughter of Edward Rishworth.
B. Banks was married to Elizabeth Alcock, sister of Lydia. He was later to be killed in the January 1692 massacre.

References

External links
The Family of Dummer of British Origin
The families of Dummer

1636 births
1692 deaths
American people of English descent
American theologians
Harvard University alumni
People of colonial Maine
People of colonial Massachusetts
People murdered in Maine
People of pre-statehood Maine
People from colonial Boston